September 1913 may refer to:

September 1913 (month), a 30-day month that began on a Monday
September 1913 (poem), a poem by W. B. Yeats

Date and time disambiguation pages